Smilkovci is a village in the municipality of Gazi Baba, North Macedonia.

Demographics
According to the 2021 census, the village had a total of 371 inhabitants. Ethnic groups in the village include:
Macedonians 348 
Persons for whom data are taken from administrative sources 21
Others 2

References

Villages in Gazi Baba Municipality